In enzymology, an orotate reductase (NADPH) is an enzyme that catalyzes the chemical reaction

(S)-dihydroorotate + NADP+  orotate + NADPH + H+

Thus, the two substrates of this enzyme are (S)-dihydroorotate and NADP+, whereas its 3 products are orotate, NADPH, and H+.

This enzyme belongs to the family of oxidoreductases, specifically those acting on the CH-CH group of donor with NAD+ or NADP+ as acceptor.  The systematic name of this enzyme class is (S)-dihydroorotate:NADP+ oxidoreductase. Other names in common use include orotate reductase, dihydroorotate dehydrogenase, dihydro-orotic dehydrogenase, L-5,6-dihydro-orotate:NAD+ oxidoreductase, and orotate reductase (NADPH).  It has one cofactor, FAD.

References

 
 

EC 1.3.1
NADPH-dependent enzymes
Flavoproteins
Enzymes of unknown structure